Thésy is a commune in the Jura department in the Bourgogne-Franche-Comté region in eastern France.

Population

See also 
 Communes of the Jura department

References 

Communes of Jura (department)